Ron Folman ((Born Feb 16th, 1963), is an Israeli quantum physicist and social activist. He works at the Ben-Gurion University of the Negev (BGU) where he heads the Atom Chip group.

Biography

Folman, born in Tel Aviv, is the son of Russian born Ahuva (Luba) Gordon and Polish born Yeshayahu Folman. Folman’s mother, who barely escaped with her family from the burning city of Minsk as the Nazi army advanced, tried to make it to the land of Israel on the famous Exodus refugee ship, only to be returned by the British to Germany.
 
In 1998, Folman received his PhD degree from the Weizmann Institute of Science (work conducted at CERN).
Between the years 2000-2003, he worked as a Researcher at the University of Heidelberg (Marie Curie fellow), Germany, and before that in 1999-2000 as a post-doctoral fellow in Innsbruck.
He is an advocate of Human Rights, Animal Rights, Social justice, Peace and Environmental sustainability.

Folman’s father is a survivor of Auschwitz where he was numbered B-1367. Folman tattooed an exact replica on his arm.

Activism 

 Human Rights: Folman has been a member of Amnesty International (AI) and in the 90s he was the chairperson of the Israeli Section of the organization. 
 Environmental Sustainability: Folman has been an active member of Greenpeace
 Social Justice: Folman was a member of the board of the University center for the promotion of education and careers among the Bedouins of the Negev desert.

Science
Folman is a professor of quantum physics at Ben-Gurion University of the Negev (BGU) where he heads the Atom Chip group. He was the founder and first director of the BGU center for quantum science and technology since 2010, and the founder and first director of the center for nano-fabrication since 2003. Folman is one of the inventors of the Atom Chip. 
Folman is active in probing the interface between the general theory of relativity (gravity) and quantum mechanics. 

Folman is involved in anti-matter physics at CERN (GBAR) and in the searches for Dark Matter (GNOME). 
In 2011, he received the Willis Lamb award and in 2013, he was a Miller visiting professor at Berkeley

In 2021, Folman received the Falling Walls award for physics.

References

External links 
 A self-interfering clock as a “which path” witness, sciencemag
 An experimental test of the geodesic rule proposition for the noncyclic geometric phase, Science & AAAS
 What time does Schrödinger's clock show? | Vikki Academy, YouTube
 The AtomChip: Bringing Nanofabrication and Quantum Optics Together, azonano
 Einstein would have been pleased, jpost
 חופש, אהבה וננו- טכנולוגיה, Haaretz

1963 births
Living people